Mary Chemweno Koskei (2 February 1959) is a former Kenyan middle distance runner who specialised in 400 m, 800 m and 1500 m events. She won the gold medal in the inaugural 1979 African Championships in 800 metres, and another gold medal six years later in 1500 metres at the 1985 edition. She is also a three-time Kenyan national champion, having won both the 400 and 800 metres events in 1981 as well as the 800 m event again in 1986. Mid-career, in the early 1980s, she married long-distance runner Kipsubai Koskei.

Achievements

References

External links

All-Athletics profile

1959 births
Living people
Kenyan female middle-distance runners
African Games bronze medalists for Kenya
African Games medalists in athletics (track and field)
Athletes (track and field) at the 1987 All-Africa Games
20th-century Kenyan women
21st-century Kenyan women